The 2014–15 Conference USA men's basketball season began with practices in October 2014, followed by the start of the 2014–15 NCAA Division I men's basketball season in November.

Preseason

Preseason Polls

Preseason All-Conference Team

Rankings

Conference schedules

Conference matrix
This table summarizes the head-to-head results between teams in conference play.

Player of the week
Players of the week
Throughout the conference regular season, the C-USA offices named one or two players of the week and one or two freshmen of the week each Monday.

Honors and awards

All-Conference USA Awards and Teams

Postseason

Conference USA Tournament

 March 11–14, Conference USA Basketball Tournament, Legacy Arena, Birmingham

NCAA tournament

National Invitation Tournament

CollegeInsider.com Postseason Tournament

References